Feud of the West is a 1936 American Western film directed by Harry L. Fraser and starring Hoot Gibson, Buzz Barton and Bob Kortman. It is a B film made by the Poverty Row company Diversion Pictures.

Partial cast
 Hoot Gibson as 'Whitey' Revel  
 Buzz Barton as Six Bits  
 Bob Kortman as 'Hawk' Decker  
 Ed Cassidy as Greg Walters  
 Joan Barclay as Molly Henderson  
 Nelson McDowell as Wild Horse Henderson 
 Reed Howes as Bart Hunter  
 Lew Meehan as Rockin U Cowhand Lew  
 Roger Williams as Rockin U Cowhand Johnnie

References

Bibliography
 Boyd Magers & Michael G. Fitzgerald. Westerns Women: Interviews with 50 Leading Ladies of Movie and Television Westerns from the 1930s to the 1960s. McFarland, 2004.

External links
 

1936 films
1936 Western (genre) films
1930s English-language films
American Western (genre) films
Films directed by Harry L. Fraser
American black-and-white films
Grand National Films films
1930s American films